The 1996 Vanderbilt Commodores football team represented Vanderbilt University in the 1996 NCAA Division I-A football season. The team played their home games at Vanderbilt Stadium in Nashville, Tennessee.

Schedule

Roster

References

Vanderbilt
Vanderbilt Commodores football seasons
Vanderbilt Commodores football